The Hammond Heroes were a planned professional indoor football team founded by Tommy Smith as a member team of the National Indoor Football League and based in Hammond, Louisiana. They were to have played their home games at the University Center on the campus of Southeastern Louisiana University in Hammond.  However, before they could even play one down, they disappeared from the NIFL schedule and were never heard from again.

External links
 Official Site
 OurSports Central webpage for Heroes

National Indoor Football League teams
American football teams in Louisiana
Sports teams in Hammond, Louisiana
2006 establishments in Louisiana
2006 disestablishments in Louisiana
American football teams established in 2006
American football teams disestablished in 2006